The 1972 United States Senate election in Tennessee took place on November 7, 1972, concurrently with the U.S. presidential election as well as other elections to the United States Senate in other states as well as elections to the United States House of Representatives and various state and local elections. Incumbent Republican U.S. Senator Howard Baker won re-election to a second term.

Candidates

Republican
Howard Baker, incumbent U.S. Senator

Democratic
Ray Blanton, U.S. Representative

Results

See also
 1972 United States Senate elections

References 

1972
Tennessee
United States Senate